Coon Bone Island is an island in the Laurel Fork along the eastern flanks of Middle Mountain in Randolph County, West Virginia. Coon Bone Island lies within the Monongahela National Forest.

See also 
List of islands of West Virginia
Laurel Fork

References

River islands of West Virginia
Landforms of Randolph County, West Virginia
Monongahela National Forest